Harrinson Mancilla Mulato (born 22 December 1991) is a Colombian professional footballer who plays as a midfielder for Gimnasia La Plata.

Club career
Mancilla made his professional debut with Tigres F.C. in a 0-0 Categoría Primera A tie with Once Caldas on 5 February 2017. A mainstay at Tigres from 2012 to 2017, Mancilla joined Cúcuta Deportivo in 2018.

In January 2020, he signed with Gimnasia y Esgrima in Argentina. At the end of January 2022, Mancilla moved to fellow league club Sarmiento on a one-year loan with a purchase option.

Honours
Cúcuta Deportivo
Categoría Primera B: 2018

References

External links

1991 births
Living people
Sportspeople from Cauca Department
Colombian footballers
Colombian expatriate footballers
Association football midfielders
Categoría Primera A players
Categoría Primera B players
Argentine Primera División players
Cúcuta Deportivo footballers
Club de Gimnasia y Esgrima La Plata footballers
Club Atlético Sarmiento footballers
Colombian expatriate sportspeople in Argentina
Expatriate footballers in Argentina